Creve Coeur is a village in Mauritius.

References 

Populated places in Mauritius